The Belgian women's national tennis team, managed by the Belgian Tennis Federation, has been competing in the International Tennis Federation sanctioned Fed Cup since the very beginning: 1963. It has won the competition once, in 2001. Both Kim Clijsters and Justine Henin won their singles matches to seal the first victory for Belgium against Russia in Madrid.

Players
Note: players in bold are part of the 2018 Fed Cup team.

Results

Overview

Head-to-head

By Decade

1963–1969

1980–1989

1990–1999

2000–2009

2010–2019

2020–2029

Famous players 
Kim Clijsters
Dominique Monami
Justine Henin
Sabine Appelmans
Els Callens
Laurence Courtois
Ann Devries
Michele Gurdal
Monique Van Haver
Sandra Wasserman
Yanina Wickmayer
Kirsten Flipkens

Coaches

Team statistics
Longest rubber: 3 hrs 35 mins – Els Callens defeated Virginia Ruano Pascual of Spain  
Longest tie-break: 24 Points, 13/11 – Jennifer Capriati of the United States defeated Sandra Wasserman  
Most games in a rubber: 42 Games, 6–7(4) 7–6(8) 9–7 – Meghann Shaughnessy of the United States defeated Kirsten Flipkens
Oldest player: Christiane Mercelis – 37 years 232 days (1969)
Youngest player: Tamaryn Hendler – 14 years 252 days (2007)

See also 
 Belgium Davis Cup team

External links 

Billie Jean King Cup teams
Fed Cup
Tennis